Italy competed at the 2018 European Athletics Championships in Berlin, Germany, from 6 to 12 August 2018.

Medals

Finalists
Italy national athletics team ranked 14th in the EAA placing table. Rank obtained by assigning eight points in the first place and so on to the eight finalists (20 athletes or team).

Selected athletes
On 24 April 2018 the technical commissioner of the high level of the Italian national team Elio Locatelli, illustrated the composition of the national marathon team, and FIDAL has announced the names of the athletes already selected for the race walk team for the European Championships 2018.

Team
On 19 July 2018, the complete team was announced: 49 men, 40 women, the largest team since the 95 athletes of Munchen 2002. It remains to select a seventh athlete for the men's 4 × 400 m relay. On 27 July 2018 the selection of three other male athletes was announced, the total therefore reaches 92 (52 men and 40 women).

Italy closes with 4 medalists, 18 finalists (excluding teams), and 9 first of those not admitted to the final.

Men

Women

See also
 Italy national athletics team
 Italy at the 2018 European Championships

References

External links
 EAA official site 
 Profiles of athletes of the Italian team 

Italy at the European Athletics Championships
Nations at the 2018 European Athletics Championships
2018 in Italian sport